Noqol is a village in Padena-ye Olya Rural District, Padena District, Semirom County, Isfahan Province, Iran. At the 2006 census, its population was 315, in 73 families.

Etymology

The name "Noqol" is derived from the Persian name "Now Qaleh", which means "new castle ". So "Noqol" is a combination of shorted variant of two words " Now" "نو" and "Qaleh" "قلعه "."Now" in Persian means "new" and "Qaleh" means "castle".

Geography

Climate
Noqol has a beautiful spring covered by apple blossoms, a green heaven like summer with perfume of reached apples, a colorful orange, red and yellow autumn and a snowy winter in which the temperature can drop to below freezing point.

Ethnicity
Historically they have called themselves Tajik to distinguish themselves, first, from the Qashqai a nomadic Turkic tribe that have been their neighbors for at least two centuries, and secondly from the Lurs, who lives in the west range of the Dena mountains. so they are ethnically Tajik. Tajik is a subdivision of Fars (Persian).

Religion

Noqol's people belong to Jafari shia faith. There is no holy shrine and clergyman in the village but they historically respect two holy shrines outside the village; Pir davood in Kohangan and Seyed Mohammad in Khafr. In the recent years, specially the young generation, don't believe the holiness of these shrines.

History

Noqol is a village in the collection of villages called Padena.  Padena is located less than 150 km north-west of Persepolis, the glorious capital of Achaemenian Empire. Although, there is not a credible resource on the history of this village, mostly because of lack of scientific study,  but,  since this mountain region, has been one of the main source of water nearby the capital of Achaemenian Empire, it probably, inhabited and had a significant strategic importance for the world most powerful empire on fifth century B.C. There are some ruined grave nearby the village shows an unknown history. There are also, many customs, believes, traditions and words in the culture of this village trace back to the Ancient Persia.

After invasion of Turks and Mongols to Persia, this village as same as the other Iranian farmers who was living in the rural areas has engaged in a conflict with the nomadic Turkic tribes looking for pasture for their flock of sheep. This conflict in the past millennium has been the destiny of the people of this village and the other villages in Padena. In the nineteenth century, although they were working and living in the village, all the lands of village possessed to Qashqai Khans. Some modern historical events such as;  Iranian Constitutional Revolution in 1906, Oppression of Nomads ( Feudalists ) and Land Reform in 1960s made them the owners of lands of the village.

Economy

Agricultural products, especially red and golden apple, are the main source of income in this village.

Natural Resources

Water is the most important natural resource in this village. The main stream, recently canalized, used for irrigation of apple gardens, originates from the Pazanpir Peak.

Kuh-e Noqol
Kuh-e Noqol is a  mountain peak located south of the village of Noqol. According to Peakery.com, "it ranks as the 172nd highest mountain in Işfahān and the 1535th highest mountain in Iran. The nearest peaks are, Kuh-e Cheshmeh Nul, Kuh-e Dena, Kuh-e Chalchavili, Kuh-e Almalu, and Kuh-e Dama". Although the mountain receives a lot of precipitation in winter,  there is little water resource in the summer, which distinguishes it from the mountain of Dena (Dinar).  Kuh-e Noqol consists of dark black rocks, that's why it is named 'Kuhe e Siyah' (Persian کوه سیاه ), meaning Black Mountain.

References 

Populated places in Semirom County